Pride and joy: children's portraits in the Netherlands, 1500–1700, was an exhibition held jointly by the Frans Hals Museum in Haarlem and the Royal Museum of Fine Arts, Antwerp, over several months in 2000–2001. It was the first exhibition with a particular focus on images of childhood from the early-modern Low Countries.

The exhibition catalog included detailed discussions of 85 paintings from various collection holders, that together give an overview of four basic aspects of daily life in 17th-century portraits of children and families from the Low Countries: family values, educating children, children at play, and children's fashions. The English translation of the catalogue was published in 2001.

Since children's portraits are often quite popular, the exhibition was restricted by rules governing insurance and loans of popular pieces. The introduction to the catalog discusses and reproduces several paintings that could not be exhibited. The Rijksmuseum Amsterdam however was able to loan 11 works for the exhibition. The catalog is organized loosely by time period, starting with the earliest works.

References 

Art exhibitions in Belgium
Art exhibitions in the Netherlands
Art museums and galleries in Belgium
Frans Hals Museum
Lists of paintings
Paintings of children